Andrew Manze (born 14 January 1965) is a British conductor and violinist living in Germany, noted for his interpretation of Baroque violin music.

Born in Beckenham, United Kingdom, Manze read Classics at Clare College, Cambridge.  Manze studied violin and worked with Ton Koopman (his director in the Amsterdam Baroque Orchestra) and Simon Standage (his teacher in the Royal Academy of Music).  He began his musical career as a specialist in Early Music, and has recorded as a soloist for such labels as Harmonia Mundi.   He became associate director of The Academy of Ancient Music in 1996.

From 2003 to 2007, he was artistic director of The English Concert, with whom he recorded commercially for Harmonia Mundi.  He has also conducted recordings on labels such as Onyx and Pentatone.  Manze was associate guest conductor of the BBC Scottish Symphony Orchestra (BBC SSO) from September 2010 to August 2014, and recorded with the BBC SSO for Hyperion.

Outside of the UK, from 2006 to 2014, Manze was principal conductor and artistic director of the Helsingborg Symphony Orchestra.  He made a number of recordings with them, including Beethoven's Symphony No 3 (Harmonia Mundi), Stenhammar Piano Concerti (Hyperion), and a cycle of the Brahms symphonies (CPO).  In September 2014, he became principal conductor of the NDR Radiophilharmonie.  In March 2017, the orchestra announced the extension of Manze's contract through to 2021.  In February 2019, the orchestra announced a further extension of Manze's contract to 2023.

Manze has been a fellow of the Royal Academy of Music and a Visiting Professor at the Oslo Academy.  He has contributed to new editions of sonatas and concertos by Mozart and Bach published by Bärenreiter and Breitkopf and Härtel. He also teaches, edits and writes about music, as well as broadcasting regularly on radio and television.  In 2011, Manze received the Rolf Schock Prize.

Recordings 

Vaughan Williams, Symphonies Nos 2 & 8, Royal Liverpool Philharmonic Orchestra, ONYZ 4155 (2016)
Mendelssohn - Symphonies Nos. 1 & 3. NDR Radiophilharmonie. PENTATONE PTC 5186595 (2017).
 Mozart - Piano Concerti Nos. 25 & 26 Francesco Piemontesi (piano) Scottish Chamber Orchestra Linn Records  (2017).
 Elgar & Tchaikovsky. Johannes Moser, Orchestre de la Suisse Romande. PENTATONE PTC 5186570 (2017). 
 Vaughan Williams Symphonies Nos 3 & 4, Royal Liverpool Philharmonic Orchestra, ONYX 4161 (2017) 
 Vaughan Williams Symphonies No 5 & 6 Royal Liverpool Philharmonic ONYX 4184 (2018) 
Mendelssohn - Symphonies Nos 4 & 5. NDR Radiophilharmonie. PENTATONE PTC 5186611 (2018).
Mendelssohn - Symphony No 2.  Anna Lucia Richter, Esther Dierkes, Robin Tritschler, NDR Radiophilharmonie, WDR Rundfunkchor Köln, NDR Chor. PENTATONE PTC 5186639 (2018).
FLOW. Annelien Van Wauwe, NDR Radiophilharmonie, Andrew Manze. Pentatone (2022)

References

External links
 Andrew Manze's website
 Intermusica agency biography of Andrew Manze
 Michael Cookson, "'If a reviewer doesn't like the work I did, I just have to accept that': Conductor Andrew Manze talks to Michael Cookson in Munich".  MusicWeb International blog, 10 January 2010
 Hartmut Welscher, "The Antidote". VAN Magazine, 10 May 2019

Baroque-violin players
English conductors (music)
British male conductors (music)
People from Beckenham
1965 births
Living people
Alumni of Clare College, Cambridge
People educated at Bedford School
Musicians from Kent
Bach conductors
British classical violinists
British male violinists
20th-century classical violinists
20th-century British conductors (music)
21st-century classical violinists
21st-century British conductors (music)
20th-century British male musicians
21st-century British male musicians
Male classical violinists